Keezhadi is a village near the village of Silaiman, on the border between Madurai and Sivagangai districts, in Tamil Nadu, India. The Keezhadi excavation site is located in this area: excavations carried out by the Archaeological Survey of India (ASI) and the Tamil Nadu Archaeology Department (TNAD) have revealed a Sangam era settlement dated to the 6th century BCE by radiocarbon dating. Claims that the results show that there was writing at that time have been challenged. It is not clear whether the potsherds containing inscriptions were found in the same archaeological layer as the 6th century samples, and University of Calcutta archaeologist Bishnupriya Basak said that "This unfortunately is not clear from the report and is very crucial", adding that the issues of "layer, period and absolute dates" needed clarity. Dravidian University archaeologist E. Harsha Vardhan said that a single report was not enough to "state scientifically that the Tamil-Brahmi script belongs to the sixth century BC".

Excavations 

An archaeological survey team under Archaeologist Amarnath Ramakrishna  was first conducted in 2013 in the vicinity of the Vaigai river from Theni district to Ramanathapuram district where the river meets the sea. During the study, 293 sites, including Keezhadi, were identified to have archaeological residues. The first three phases of excavation at Keezhadi were conducted by the Archaeological Survey of India, and they dropped it from doing further research. A public interest litigation was filed and following that the court ordered the regional depart to carry forward, following which the fourth and fifth phases were conducted by the Tamil Nadu Archaeology Department.

Carbon nanomaterials in Keeladi pottery 
A team of researchers identified pottery shards at Keeladi that contain carbon nanomaterials, including single-walled and multi-walled carbon nanotubes.

See also 
 Sivaganga
 Madurai

References 

Villages in Madurai district
Tamil history
Ancient Tamil Nadu
Prehistoric India
Archaeological sites in Tamil Nadu
Tamilakam